Sewaren (pronounced SEE-waren) is an unincorporated community and census-designated place (CDP) within Woodbridge Township, in Middlesex County, New Jersey, United States. As of the 2010 United States Census, the CDP's population was 2,756.

PSE&G's Sewaren Generating Station is a 538 megawatt facility on  along the Arthur Kill. The facility had five steam generators and one combustion turbine. Four of the steam units were installed during and just after World War II, from 1942 to 1951. Generator 5, which included a gas/oil-fired boiler and two turbine generators, was dismantled in 2002. Seawaren Unit #7: installed 2018, 538 MW, Combined cycle combustion turbine, with one combustion turbine, one heat recovery steam generator, HRSG, And one steam turbine..

Geography

According to the United States Census Bureau, the CDP had a total area of 1.004 square miles (2.601 km2), including 0.954 square miles (2.471 km2) of land and 0.050 square miles (0.131 km2) of water (5.02%). Sewaren is located between Perth Amboy and Carteret, on the waterfront across the Arthur Kill waterway from Staten Island, New York, which is accessible via the Outerbridge Crossing just minutes away.

Demographics

Census 2010

Census 2000
As of the 2000 United States Census there were 2,780 people, 1,019 households, and 768 families living in the CDP. The population density was 1,129.9/km2 (2,920.9/mi2). There were 1,046 housing units at an average density of 425.1/km2 (1,099.0/mi2). The racial makeup of the CDP was 85.36% White, 5.72% African American, 0.18% Native American, 4.71% Asian, 0.04% Pacific Islander, 2.73% from other races, and 1.26% from two or more races. Hispanic or Latino of any race were 9.57% of the population.

There were 1,019 households, out of which 34.5% had children under the age of 18 living with them, 57.0% were married couples living together, 13.5% had a female householder with no husband present, and 24.6% were non-families. 20.6% of all households were made up of individuals, and 7.0% had someone living alone who was 65 years of age or older. The average household size was 2.73 and the average family size was 3.16.

In the CDP the population was spread out, with 23.8% under the age of 18, 7.5% from 18 to 24, 31.5% from 25 to 44, 24.6% from 45 to 64, and 12.6% who were 65 years of age or older. The median age was 38 years. For every 100 females, there were 92.8 males. For every 100 females age 18 and over, there were 88.1 males.

The median income for a household in the CDP was $62,381, and the median income for a family was $72,685. Males had a median income of $46,683 versus $35,655 for females. The per capita income for the CDP was $24,681. About 2.5% of families and 3.5% of the population were below the poverty line, including 0.6% of those under age 18 and 4.6% of those age 65 or over.

Education
Sewaren has one elementary school, Matthew Jago School #28.

Notable people

People who were born in, residents of, or otherwise closely associated with Sewaren include:
 John A. Hall (1877-1919), collegiate football player who was head coach of the Carlisle Indians football team in 1898.

References

External links
 Sewaren Public Library
 Sewaren.net - Historic Sewaren NJ

Neighborhoods in Woodbridge Township, New Jersey
Census-designated places in Middlesex County, New Jersey
Jersey Shore communities in Middlesex County